Yusufali Kechery (Yūsaphali Kēccēri; യൂസഫലി കേച്ചേരി 16 May 1934 – 21 March 2015) was a poet, film lyricist, film producer and director from Kerala, India. He wrote during the modern era of Malayalam poetry and won the Odakkuzhal Award, the Kerala Sahitya Academy Award and the Vallathol Award.

Career

K. P. Narayana Pisharody was Kechery's Sanskrit teacher and taught him free of cost for four years. Kechery's poetry works include Sainaba, Aayiram Navulla Mounam, Anchu Kanyakakal, Nadabhramam, Amrithu, Kecheri Puzha, Anuragagaanam Pole, Aalila, Kadhaye Premicha Kavitha, Perariyatha Nombaram and Ahaindavam.

He also directed the films Vanadevatha (1977) and Neelathamara (1979). He wrote the lyrics for the songs in the film Dhwani, which were composed by musician Naushad. In 2000 he was awarded a National Award for a Sanskrit song written for the Malayalam film Mazha (Rain).

Kechery died on 21 March 2015 at Amrita Hospital in Kochi, aged 80.

Awards

Literary awards
 1985: Kerala Sahitya Akademi Award — Aayiram Naavulla Maunam
 1987: Odakkuzhal Award — Kechery Puzha
 1988: Asan Smaraka Kavitha Puraskaram — Kechery Puzha
 1990: Asan Smaraka Kavitha Puraskaram
 2001: Deviprasadam Trust Award
 2012: Vallathol Award
 2012: Balamani Amma Award
 2013: Kerala Sahitya Akademi Fellowship

Film awards
 1993: Kerala State Film Award for Best Lyrics - Ghazal
 1994: Kerala State Film Award for Best Lyrics - Parinayam
 1998: Kerala State Film Award for Best Lyrics - Sneham
 1999:  Asianet Film Award for Best Lyricist -Deepasthambham Mahascharyam
 2000: National Film Award for Best Lyricist - Mazha
 Prem Nazir Award
 Kunchacko Memorial Award

References

External links

Hits of Yusaf Ali Kecheri 
Interview with Yusaf Ali Kecheri

1934 births
Indian male songwriters
Indian Muslims
Malayalam-language writers
Malayalam poets
Malayalam-language lyricists
People from Thrissur district
Kerala State Film Award winners
Recipients of the Kerala Sahitya Akademi Award
2015 deaths
Screenwriters from Kerala
20th-century Indian musicians
20th-century Indian dramatists and playwrights
Film musicians from Kerala
20th-century Indian poets
20th-century Indian film directors
Indian lyricists
20th-century Indian male writers
Best Lyrics National Film Award winners
20th-century male musicians